de Santi or Desanti is a surname. Notable people with the surname include:

Antonio Álvarez Desanti (born 1958), Costa Rican politician
Dominique Desanti (1920–2011), French writer
Guido De Santi (1923–1998), Italian cyclist
Marco de Santi (born 1983), Brazilian vert skater
Jean-Toussaint Desanti (1914–2002), French educator and philosopher

See also
DeSantis
De Sanctis (disambiguation)